Claude Sabbah (born 30 October 1954) is a French mathematician and researcher at École Polytechnique.

Education
Sabbah received his doctoral degree from Paris Diderot University in 1976 under the supervision of Lê Dũng Tráng.

Selected publications

Books 

 Introduction to Stokes Structures, Springer Verlag, 2012, 
 Polarizable twistor D-modules, Société Mathématique de France, 2005 
 With Jean-Michel Bony, Bernard Malgrange and Laurent Schwartz : Distributions. Dans le sillage de Laurent Schwartz, Éditions de l'École polytechnique, 2003, 
 Déformations isomonodromiques et variétés de Frobenius, EDP Sciences, 2002, 
 English translation : Isomonodromic Deformations and Frobenius Manifolds, Springer Verlag, 2008, 
 Équations différentielles à points singuliers irréguliers et phénomène de Stokes en dimension 2, Société mathématique de France, 2000,

References

External links 
 Personal website
 Claude Sabbah on Google Scholar

French mathematicians
1954 births
Living people
Academic staff of École Polytechnique